Jharkhand has 1844.00 km of national highways, 1886.40 km of state highways, 4828.10 km of major district roads and 166.00 km of other roads, totalling 8724.50 km of roads in the state.

Jharkhand has a good network of state highways. It is listed below:

References 

State Highways
State Highways in Jharkhand